Pinus cernua is a pine species, Pinaceae. It is critically endangered.

Distribution 
It is found in Vietnam. There are studies to aid conservation.

Taxonomy 
It was named by L. K. Phan ex Aver., Khang Sinh Nguyen and T. H. Nguyen, in  Nordic J. Bot. 32: 792 in 2014.

References

External links 

cernua